Sebastián Báez defeated Frances Tiafoe in the final, 6–3, 6–2 to win the singles tennis title at the 2022 Estoril Open. It was his maiden ATP Tour title.

Albert Ramos Viñolas was the defending champion, but he lost in the semifinals to Báez.

Seeds
The top four seeds received a bye into the second round.

Draw

Finals

Top half

Bottom half

Qualifying

Seeds

Qualifiers

Lucky losers

Draw

First qualifier

Second qualifier

Third qualifier

Fourth qualifier

References

External links
Main draw
Qualifying draw

Estoril Open - Singles
2022 Singles
Singles